Wisk'achani (Aymara wisk'acha a rodent, -ni a suffix, "the one with the viscacha", Hispanicized spelling Viscachani) is a mountain in the Bolivian Andes which reaches a height of approximately . It is located in the La Paz Department, Aroma Province, Sica Sica Municipality. Wisk'achani lies northwest of Tanka Tanka.

References 

Mountains of La Paz Department (Bolivia)